Colin Michael Raynor Fielder (born 5 January 1964) is an English former footballer who played for Aldershot Town, Farnborough Town, Slough Town, Woking and Yeovil Town. During his career he played as a midfielder.

Honours 
Woking
 FA Trophy: 1993–94, 1994–95

References

External links

1964 births
Living people
Sportspeople from Winchester
English footballers
Association football midfielders
Aldershot F.C. players
Farnborough F.C. players
Slough Town F.C. players
Woking F.C. players
Yeovil Town F.C. players
Aldershot Town F.C. players
English Football League players
National League (English football) players
Footballers from Hampshire